The ringed moray (Gymnothorax annulatus) is a moray eel found in the western Pacific Ocean, around the Philippines and Thailand. It was first named by D. G. Smith and E. B.Böhlke in 1997.

References

annulatus
Fish described in 1997
Fish of the Pacific Ocean